Farmers and Merchants Bank (F&M) is a historic lending institution (1871−1952) based in Downtown Los Angeles, California.  It is known both for its architecture and its pivotal role in the economic development of early Los Angeles. Other, non-related "F&M Banks" exist in many cities and towns across the United States.

History
The Farmer's and Merchants Bank was founded in 1871 by 23 prominent Los Angeles businessmen, with an initial capital of $500,000. The three largest subscribers were financier Isaias W. Hellman ($100,000), former California Governor John G. Downey ($100,000), and Ozro W. Childs ($50,000) who in later years became the founders of the University of Southern California. Other investors included Charles Ducommun ($25,000), I.M. Hellman ($20,000), and Jose Mascarel ($10,000.). Its original location was at the Pico Building, on Main Street, between what is now US 101 and Temple, roughly at the site of the  Triforium.

The Farmers and Merchants Bank was the first incorporated bank in Los Angeles, founded in 1871 by Isaias W. Hellman, a successful merchant, real estate investor, and banker who immigrated to Los Angeles in 1859; with John G Downey, the seventh governor of California; and Herman W. Hellman, the brother of Isaias. Downey was named the first president, with Isaias actually running the bank. Isaias served as president of the bank from 1890 until his death in 1920.

The bank built and moved into new offices designed by architect Ezra F. Kysor in 1874 across the street from the Pico Building. The Los Angeles National Bank moved into its facilities in the Pico Building. In 1883 the F&M Bank moved again, to Main and Commercial streets.
 
I.W. Hellman, was a cautious lender, insisting that major borrowers have good character and provide good security. Its subsequent presidents, J.A. Graves (who had been Hellman's attorney) and Victor H. Rosetti, continued Hellman's conservative practices, with a large portion of the bank's capital constantly held in Treasury securities. As a result, the Bank survived every economic panic period, from the Panic of 1873, Panic of 1893, and Panic of 1896, through the Great Depression.

However, a one-branch downtown bank was eventually seen as not likely to continue to grow. In 1956, it merged with Security First National Bank, which became in later years Security Pacific National Bank, and ultimately was acquired by the Bank of America.

The location of the bank prior to 1905 was on the southeast corner of Main and Commercial streets.

Architecture
Designed in the Classical Revival style, the 1905 Farmers and Merchants Bank remains one of Southern California's finest examples of the early "temples of finance" which were popular at the turn of the century. Its two-story facade, reminiscent of a Roman temple, is punctuated by an entrance framed with Corinthian columns topped by a large triangular pediment. Built in 1905, the bank was designed by the firm of Morgan and Walls.

Present-day
The Farmers & Merchants Bank building has been established as Los Angeles Historic-Cultural Monument #271.

Much of the original banking room remains, including light fixtures, a central skylight, and the loggia with its Victorian-style railings. Operating as a bank until its closure in the late 80s, the building now functions primarily as a special events and banquet facility and film location. The building is slated for renovation by developer Tom Gilmore and Associates.

See also
 
 Yule marble

Notes

References
Isaias W. Hellman and the Farmers and Merchants Bank, by Robert Glass Cleland and Frank B. Putnam (The Huntington Library, San Marino (1965)
"Guide Français de Los Angeles et du Sud de la Californie", published in 1932 by F. Loyer et C. Beaudreau
1872 Los Angeles City and County Directory

External links

"Farmers and Merchants Bank and Annexes" Los Angeles Conservancy Website: Explore L.A.; Historic Places. Accessed 6 November 2013
Scripophily.com "1872 Farmers and Merchants Bank of Los Angeles document" — signed by Isaias W. Hellman Pioneer and U.S.C. Founder.
Scripophily.com "An 1874 Farmers and Merchants Bank of Los Angeles check" — dated 1874 signed by California Governor John G. Downey.

Bank buildings in California
Buildings and structures in Downtown Los Angeles
Commercial buildings in Los Angeles
Defunct banks of the United States
 
History of Los Angeles
Los Angeles Historic-Cultural Monuments
Banks established in 1871
Banks disestablished in 1956
1871 establishments in California
1956 disestablishments in California
Defunct companies based in Greater Los Angeles
19th century in Los Angeles
1900s architecture in the United States
1905 establishments in California
Commercial buildings completed in 1905
Greek Revival architecture in California
Neoclassical architecture in California
Main Street (Los Angeles)